Dave Stewart Simpson (born March 3, 1962) is a Canadian former ice hockey player, now executive director of the Business Families Centre at the Richard Ivey School of Business at the University of Western Ontario and known as David Simpson.

He played junior hockey for the London Knights of the Ontario Hockey League, and recorded the best single season in team history when he recorded 155 points in 1981-82. He holds the record for most points by a rookie in a single game. In that year he also won the Red Tilson Trophy, Bobby Smith Trophy, William Hanley Trophy and the Eddie Powers Memorial Trophy for his accomplishments in junior hockey, as well as being named the CHL Player of the Year.  No other player in OHL history has won so many trophies in one season.

He was drafted in the third round (59th overall) of the 1980 NHL Entry Draft by NY Islanders.  He played minor pro hockey in Indianapolis and Baltimore, but decided in 1984 that hockey was not for him and quit to concentrate on his schooling.  He received a B.A. in 1985 from the University of Western Ontario, and an M.B.A. in 1988 from the Richard Ivey School of Business.

He is the older brother of former NHL player and assistant coach and current CBC hockey broadcaster Craig Simpson and MSG Plus sportscaster Christine Simpson. He is also the son of Canadian former Olympic athlete Marion Simpson.

Simpson's nephew, Dillon Simpson, was drafted by the Edmonton Oilers.

Career statistics

References

External links

Profile at Ivey School of Business
Profile at Hockey Draft Central

1962 births
Baltimore Skipjacks players
Sportspeople from London, Ontario
Living people
London Knights players
New York Islanders draft picks
Ice hockey people from Ontario
Canadian ice hockey centres